Calicium victorianum is a crustose lichen that is found growing on trees and wooden materials.

It is found mostly in the southern hemisphere in the South West region of Western Australia and Queensland in eastern Australia. It is also found in New Zealand and is known from a single population in England.

References

victorianum
Lichen species
Lichens described in 1889
Fungi native to Australia